The Ethics and Public Policy Center (EPPC) is a conservative, Washington, D.C.-based think tank and advocacy group. Founded in 1976, the group describes itself as "dedicated to applying the Judeo-Christian moral tradition to critical issues of public policy", and advocacy of founding principles such as the rule of law. The EPPC is active in a number of ways, including hosting lectures and conferences, publishing written work from the group’s scholars, and running programs, which are intended to explore areas of public concern and interest.

Since February 2021, EPPC's president is Ryan T. Anderson, who previously worked as the William E. Simon Senior Research Fellow at The Heritage Foundation. He succeeded Edward Whelan, who serves as EPPC's vice president, and also holds the title of distinguished senior fellow and Antonin Scalia Chair in Constitutional Studies. George Weigel, Catholic theologian and papal biographer, is also a distinguished senior fellow. EPPC is a qualified 501(c)(3) organization.

History
EPPC was founded in 1976 by Ernest W. Lefever, an American political theorist. He was nominated in 1981 for a US State Department position by US President Ronald Reagan before ultimately being rejected for the opportunity for his controversial background. He served as president of EPPC until 1989 and continued to write scholarly articles for EPPC until his death in 2009. Lefever said upon founding the institute that "a small ethically oriented center" should "respond directly to ideological critics who insist the corporation is fundamentally unjust."

EPPC's website states that the organization works "to apply the riches of the Judeo-Christian tradition to contemporary questions of law, culture, and politics, in pursuit of America’s continued civic and cultural renewal." From 2003 to 2018, EPPC published The New Atlantis: A Journal of Technology and Society. In January 2018, The New Atlantis became independent of EPPC and is now published by the Center for the Study of Technology and Society.

Members
As of May 2021, there were more than thirty scholars listed on EPPC's "Fellows and Scholars" page. They include former EPPC presidents Ed Whelan and George Weigel. Other noted scholars include Stanley Kurtz, Lance Morrow, Roger Severino, and Carl Trueman.

References

External links
 

 
Organizations established in 1976
Ethics organizations
Charities based in Washington, D.C.
Conservative organizations in the United States
Advocacy groups in the United States